Gamblin is a surname. Notable people with the surname include:

Derek Gamblin, English amateur footballer, who played as a full back
Jacques Gamblin (born 1957), French actor
Kip Gamblin (born 1975), Australian ballet dancer and actor
Laura Gamblin (born 1998), French squash player
Lucien Gamblin (1890–1972), French international football player

See also
A Gamblin Fool, 1920 short Western film released by Universal Film Mfg. Co.
Bill's Gamblin Hall and Saloon, casino and hotel located on the Las Vegas Strip in Paradise, Nevada
Gambling
Gembling